The Bandini 1100 is a car model produced from 1947 until 1950 by the Italian company Bandini Cars. It was the successor to the early 1946 model. A racing version was produced under the name Bandini 1100 siluro.

History
In 1947 Ilario Bandini, developed the project of a car that was suitable for everyday life but also to the races.

The prototype was fitted with an engine derived from a Fiat 1100 to which Bandini adapted cutting a head DOHC from Alfa Romeo  8-cylinder. The distribution, compulsorily amended as well as camshafts, it was a chain and gears.

The production of a small lot of this model provided by contrast, the use of engines and exchange Siata 1500 cc but, in fact, stopped a few examples.

This was the second Bandini to cross national boundaries. Tony Pompeo, importer italoamericano, bought one, at the end of  1940s, rigorously painted red, which led to New York City to run it in the category FM League SCCA (Sports Car Club of America). In the photos, driving fast is the "climber and road racer" Giovanni Bracco, also winner of Mille Miglia, 1952, Coppa Acerbo and Pescara Circuit.

The chassis

The particular design chassy and tubes special steel section elliptical-derived aircraft, Caproni, ensured the proper relationship between lightness and torsional rigidity. The first frame was made completely into the Bandini.

 Suspension:
 Front: Independent, triangles overlapping with shock hydraulic telescopic tilted and springs cylindrical helical coaxial
 Rear: a bridge with rigid leaf spring semiellittiche longitudinal
 Braking system:
 Service: hydraulics, drum front and rear
 Parking Mechanical tape, on transmission shaft
 Steering: a worm
 Wheels: ray Borrani
 Fuel tank: 
 Transmission: rear half shafts central differential
 Drive: right (at the request left)
 Weight (all up):

The engine

In 1100 Fiat/Alfa tuned DOHC
 Positioning: forward longitudinal, 4-cylinder in-line
 Displacement: 1089 cc
 Bore and Stroke: 68 mm x 75 mm
 Head: Derivative Alfa Romeo 6 adapted to the 4-cylinder engine, 2 inclined valves per cylinder, 2 camshafts controlled by chain and gears
 Power maximum: 
 Power: 2 carburettors
 Lubricate: housing wet with pump gear and vertical cooler on the front
 Cooling: forced liquid with centrifugal pump and vertical cooleron the front
 Gearbox and clutch: 4 speed+ RG, clutch single dry disc 
 Ignition and electrical equipment: coil and distributor switch, battery 12 V and generator

In the Fiat-Siata 1500 
 Positioning: forward longitudinal, 4-cylinder in-line
 Displacement: 1496 cc
 Power maximum:  at 6000 rpm
 Power: 2 carburettors
 Compression ratio: 9,3:1
 Lubricate: housing wet with pump gear and vertical cooler on the front
 Cooling: forced liquid with centrifugal pump and vertical cooler on the front
 Gearbox and clutch: 4 speed+ reverse gears, clutch single dry disc
 Ignition and electrical equipment: coil and distributor switch, battery 12 V and generator

The body

The body, another Rocco Motto design, is an aluminium two-seater with large headlights and horizontal elliptical grille, emphasizing a very rounded front. Two "slides" separated replace windshield. A "modanatura" part from the center front of the grid and having lapped the emblem enlarging section hyperboloid making and emphasizing the air-intake at the centre of the bonnet. The sides and the doors and shall not affect the main lines arising from the front, they weaken in the back that is so soft and clean in complete harmony with the rest of the car.

See also
 Ilario Bandini
 Bandini Cars

Bandini vehicles
1950s cars
Sports cars
Cars introduced in 1947